Piparwar is a village in the Tandwa CD block in the Simaria subdivision of  the Chatra district in the Indian state of Jharkhand.

Geography

Location                            

Area overview
The map alongside shows that the forests (mark the light shading), covering around 60% of Chatra district, are evenly spread across the district. The map provides links to three CCL operational areas.

Note: The map alongside presents some of the notable locations in the district. All places marked in the map are linked in the larger full screen map.

Civic administration

Police station
Piparwar police station serves Tandwa CD block.

Economy

Coal mining
The North Karanpura Coalfield is spread across parts of Ranchi, Hazaribagh, Chatra and Latehar districts of Jharkhand covering an area of 1,230 km2. This coalfield in the upper reaches of the Damodar Valley, has reserves of around 14 billion tonnes of coal, very little of which has been exploited. Karkatta, KD Hesalong, Manki, Churi, Bachara UG, Bachara OC, and Dakara are long established collieries south of the Damodar. North of the Damodar lies comparatively new major mines such as Piparwar Mine and Ashoka Project. 23 mines are planned in the northern sector. Those in an advanced stage of planning are: Dhadu, Purnadih, Magadh, and Amrapali. This happens to be the largest mining sector of Central Coalfields Limited.

The projects of the Piparwar Area are: Piparwar opencast, Ray-Bachra underground, Ashoka opencast, Piparwar coal handling plant/ coal preparation plant. The Area office is at Piparwar, PO Bachra.

References

Villages in Chatra district